Richard Brody (born 1958) is an American film critic who has written for The New Yorker since 1999.

Education
Brody grew up in Roslyn, New York, and attended Princeton University, receiving a B.A. in comparative literature in 1980. He first became interested in films after seeing Jean-Luc Godard's seminal French New Wave film Breathless during his freshman year at Princeton. In the early 1980s, after graduating from college, Brody briefly lived in Paris. He is the author of a biography of Godard.

Career
Before becoming a film critic, Brody worked on documentaries and made several independent films.  In December 2014, he was made a Chevalier (Knight) in the Ordre des Arts et des Lettres for his contributions in popularizing French cinema in America.

Favorite films 
Brody participated in the 2012 Sight & Sound critics' poll, where he listed his ten favorite films as follows:

Gertrud (Denmark, 1964)
The Great Dictator (USA, 1940)
Husbands (USA, 1970)
Journey to Italy (Italy, 1954)
King Lear (USA, 1987)
The Last Laugh (Germany, 1924)
Marnie (USA, 1964)
Playtime (France, 1967)
The Rules of the Game (France, 1939)
Shoah (France, 1985)

Best films of the year 

2007: In Praise of Love
2008: Wendy and Lucy
2009: Fantastic Mr. Fox
2010: Shutter Island 
2011: The Future 
2012: Holy Motors and Moonrise Kingdom
2013: The Wolf of Wall Street 
2014: The Grand Budapest Hotel 
2015: Chi-Raq 
2016: Little Sister 
2017: Get Out 
2018: Madeline's Madeline
2019: The Irishman 
2020: Kajillionaire
2021: The French Dispatch
2022: Benediction

Religious convictions
Brody was described as Jewish in a 1993 New York Times profile. He has since identified as an atheist.

Bibliography

References

External links
 New Yorker page

1958 births
Living people
American expatriates in France
American film critics
National Society of Film Critics Members
Chevaliers of the Ordre des Arts et des Lettres
The New Yorker critics
People from Roslyn, New York
Princeton University alumni
20th-century American male writers
21st-century American male writers
20th-century American non-fiction writers
21st-century American non-fiction writers
American male non-fiction writers
Jewish American atheists